The MAMA Award for Best Male / Female Vocal Performance – Solo or Group (베스트 보컬 퍼포먼스 (남자/그룹 – 솔로/솔로)) is an award presented annually by CJ E&M Pictures (Mnet).

It was first awarded at the 12th Mnet Asian Music Awards ceremony held in 2010; Gummy and 2AM won the awards for their vocal performance in "Because You're a Man" and "Can't Let You Go Even If I Die" respectively, and it is given in honor for the artist/s with the best vocal performance in the music industry.

History

Winners and nominees

Multiple awards for Best Vocal Performance
4 awards
 Ailee

3 awards
 IU

2 awards
 Davichi
 Heize
 Bolbbalgan4
 Taeyeon

Notes

Gallery of winners

References

External links
 Mnet Asian Music Awards official website

MAMA Awards